The Morris Hills Regional District is a comprehensive regional public school district that consists of two four-year public high schools serving four suburban communities in Morris County, New Jersey, United States. The district serves the residential communities of Denville Township (Denville Township School District), Rockaway Borough (Rockaway Borough Public Schools), Rockaway Township (Rockaway Township Public Schools) and Wharton (Wharton Borough School District).

As of the 2019–20 school year, the district, comprised of two schools, had an enrollment of 2,778 students and 250.0 classroom teachers (on an FTE basis), for a student–teacher ratio of 11.1:1.

The district is classified by the New Jersey Department of Education as being in District Factor Group "GH", the third-highest of eight groupings. District Factor Groups organize districts statewide to allow comparison by common socioeconomic characteristics of the local districts. From lowest socioeconomic status to highest, the categories are A, B, CD, DE, FG, GH, I and J.

Awards and recognition
For the 1996–97 school year, both Morris Hills High School and Morris Knolls High School were named as "Star Schools" by the New Jersey Department of Education, the highest honor that a New Jersey school can achieve.

Schools
Schools in the district (with 2019–20 enrollment data from the National Center for Education Statistics) are:
Morris Hills High School(1,258, located in Rockaway Borough) serves all students from Wharton, along with some students from Rockaway Borough and Rockaway Township (the White Meadow Lake section and other southern portions of the township). The Academy for Mathematics, Science, and Engineering, a magnet high school program that is part of the Morris County Vocational School District is jointly operated on the Morris Hills campus.
Todd M. Toriello, Principal
Morris Knolls High School (1,412, located in Denville) serves all students from Denville, as well as those from parts of Rockaway Borough and portions of Rockaway Township (most of the township, with the exception of White Meadow Lake and other areas in the southern part of the township).
Ryan MacNaughton, Principal

Administration
Core members of the district's administration are:
James Jencarelli, Superintendent
Joanne Gilman, Business Administrator / Board Secretary

Board of education
The district's board of education, comprised of nine members, sets policy and oversees the fiscal and educational operation of the district through its administration. As a Type II school district, the board's trustees are elected directly by voters to serve three-year terms of office on a staggered basis, with three seats up for election each year held (since 2012) as part of the November general election. The board appoints a superintendent to oversee the day-to-day operation of the district. Seats on the board of education are allocated based on the populations of the constituent municipalities, with four seats assigned to Rockaway Township, three to Denville Township, one to Rockaway Borough and one to Wharton.

References

External links 
Official site of Morris Hills Regional High School District

Morris Hills Regional High School District, National Center for Education Statistics

Denville Township, New Jersey
Rockaway, New Jersey
Rockaway Township, New Jersey
Wharton, New Jersey
New Jersey District Factor Group GH
School districts in Morris County, New Jersey